The Protestant Christian Church in Bali is a Reformed denomination established on 11 November 1931 in Bali, Indonesia. It was a fruit of the efforts of the Christian and Missionary Alliance, but the Dutch Reformed Church and the Church in East Java participated in the work. Significant development took place after 1950. The denomination adopted its current name on 21 April 1949. The church is located in Bali, Java, West Nusa Tenggara. There are also churches located in Hamburg, Germany and two churches are in Bern and Amsterdam.

Membership is approximately 12,000 in 72 congregations.

The church is a member of the World Communion of Reformed Churches.

Locations of International Churches 

International Christian Community

Sundays 8.30am ( Indonesian ) 10.30 ( English w/ Indonesian & Mandarin Translation )

Address:

IC Center Bali at Mal Bali Galeria
Jl. Bypass Ngurah Rai
Level 4 of the Parking Building Across from Matahari

References 

1931 establishments in the Dutch East Indies
Calvinist denominations established in the 20th century
Members of the World Communion of Reformed Churches
Organizations based in Bali
Reformed denominations in Indonesia
Religious organizations based in Indonesia
Christian organizations established in 1931
Religion in Bali